Seymour Joseph Guy (1824–1910), was an American romance painter.

Biography
He was born and trained in London but moved to New York City, where he is known for genre works. He trained for four years with the portrait painter Ambrosini Jerôme and married the daughter of an engraver, Anna Maria Barber, before his move to New York in 1854. He was a member of the Sketch club and became friends with John George Brown, and they both began to paint genre works of children, probably inspired by their own, as Guy eventually had nine.
He died at his home in New York on December 10, 1910.

References

Seymour Joseph Guy on Artnet

1824 births
1910 deaths
Painters from London
19th-century American painters
American male painters
20th-century American painters
British emigrants to the United States
19th-century American male artists
20th-century American male artists